Fiscal sponsorship refers to the practice of non-profit organizations offering their legal and tax-exempt status to groups—typically projects—engaged in activities related to the sponsoring organization's mission. It typically involves a fee-based contractual arrangement between a project and an established non-profit.

Advantages of fiscal sponsorship

Fiscal sponsorship can enable projects to share a common administrative platform with a larger organization, thus increasing efficiency. In addition to legal status, sponsors can provide payroll, employee benefits, office space, publicity, fundraising assistance, and training services, sparing projects the necessity of  developing these resources and allowing them to focus on programmatic activities.

Projects may seek fiscal sponsorship for various reasons: an anticipated short lifespan, improved access to funding, increased credibility, and low-cost financial and administrative services. Fiscal sponsors can also assist nascent projects in developing the necessary organizational capabilities to eventually spin off as independent non-profits.

Risks

Fiscal sponsorship arrangements, if not handled carefully, can be vulnerable to the criticism that they serve merely as conduits for the transmission of deductible donations to entities not qualified to receive them.

However, in the last decade, the phenomenon of fiscal sponsorship has become a common ancillary activity for public charities involved in human service, environmental, and artistic endeavors. Non-profit institutions solely devoted to fiscal sponsorship have sprung up across the
country, ranging from documentary film sponsors to public health research groups to separate corporations spun off by community foundations.

Nevertheless, it is important for both sponsors and projects to understand the exact nature of their relationship.

Sponsors are advised to ensure that the activity of sponsoring a particular project is done in furtherance of its own exempted charitable purposes, as sponsors can be exposed to some liability for the actions of any sponsored projects.
Projects are advised to recognize that projects will be under the control of their sponsor(s), who may be legally responsible for the operations and activities of the project.

The benefits of immediate tax-exempt status and administrative support must be weighed against the lack of autonomy and fees typically charged by the sponsor.

Models of fiscal sponsorship

Fiscal sponsorship is practiced with many different models, which offer different benefits.

Comprehensive fiscal sponsorship distinctions
In a comprehensive fiscal sponsorship relationship, the fiscally-sponsored project
becomes a program of the fiscal sponsor, (a distinct difference from the pre-approved
grant relationship), and is a fully integrated part of the fiscal sponsor who maintains
all legal and fiduciary responsibility for the sponsored project, its employees, and
activities. Any work product is available to the public or to the charitable sector.
The fiscal sponsor assures funders that the purposes and any restrictions of all grants
and/or contributions will be met.

Pre-approved grant relationship fiscal sponsorship distinctions
In a pre-approved grant relationship sponsorship relationship, the fiscally-sponsored project does not become a program belonging to the sponsor (as is
the case with comprehensive sponsorship), but is a separate entity responsible
for managing its own tax reporting and liability issues. In addition, the sponsor
does not necessarily maintain ownership of any part of the results of the
project's work. Ownership rights should be addressed in the fiscal sponsor
agreement, and could potentially result in some type of joint ownership. The
sponsor simply assures itself that the project will use the grant funds received
to accomplish the ends described in the grant proposal.

Table comparing the models

References

Fundraising
 

3rd Edition, Fiscal Sponsorship: 6 Ways To Do It Right, 2019, by Gregory L. Colvin and Stephanie L. Petit, Adler & Colvin, Study Center Press. https://fiscalsponsordirectory.org/?product=fiscal-sponsorship-6-ways-to-do-it-right-3rd-edition